Matazu is a Local Government Area in Katsina State, Nigeria. Its headquarters are in the town of Matazu.

It has an area of 503 km and a population of 115,325 at the 2006 census.

The postal code of the area is 833.

References

Local Government Areas in Katsina State